Luigi Castagnola (born 25 August 1936) is an Italian politician. He served as a member of the Chamber of Deputies of Italy from 1983 to 1994. Castagnola is a certified teacher.

References 

1936 births
Living people
Members of the Chamber of Deputies (Italy)
Italian Communist Party politicians
Democratic Party of the Left politicians
20th-century Italian politicians